United Nations Security Council Resolution 2045 was a Resolution relating to Ivory Coast on illegal diamond unanimously adopted on 26 April 2012.

See also 
List of United Nations Security Council Resolutions 2001 to 2100

References

External links
Text of the Resolution at undocs.org

2012 United Nations Security Council resolutions
2012 in Ivory Coast
United Nations Security Council resolutions concerning Ivory Coast
April 2012 events